Ouratea quintasii is a species of plant in the family Ochnaceae. It is endemic to São Tomé Island. It is a small tree.

References

quintasii
Flora of São Tomé Island
Endemic flora of São Tomé and Príncipe
Vulnerable flora of Africa
Taxonomy articles created by Polbot